The Hawthorne USO Building, at 950 E St. in Hawthorne, Nevada, was built in 1941 as a World War II United Services Organization (USO) social hall.  It opened in January 1942.  It is a simple  "modified I plan" standard "USO Type D Federal Recreation Building", on Hawthorne's main street.

It was listed on the National Register of Historic Places in 2005.  It was deemed significant for association "with the purpose and activities of the USO in Nevada during
World War II" and for association with the West Coast U.S. Naval Ammunition Depot, sited in Hawthorne in 1928 after New Jersey's Lake Denmark Naval Ammunition Depot blew up.

See also
Bay City USO Building, Bay City, Texas, also NRHP-listed
DeRidder USO Building, DeRidder, Louisiana, also NRHP-listed
East Sixth Street USO Building, Hattiesburg, Mississippi, also NRHP-listed

References

United Service Organizations buildings
Hawthorne, Nevada
Buildings and structures in Mineral County, Nevada
History of Mineral County, Nevada
Government buildings completed in 1941
Clubhouses on the National Register of Historic Places in Nevada
Military facilities on the National Register of Historic Places in Nevada
United States home front during World War II
World War II on the National Register of Historic Places
1941 establishments in Nevada
National Register of Historic Places in Mineral County, Nevada